Juha Matti Närhi (born 17 August 1975 in Viitasaari) is a Finnish javelin thrower.

His personal best throw is 88.24 metres, achieved in July 1997 in Soini.

World indoor best holder at javelin; March 3, 1996 he threw 85.78 in Kajaani, Finland.

Achievements

Seasonal bests by year
1991 - 57.40
1992 - 70.24
1993 - 73.18
1994 - 76.14
1995 - 83.14
1996 - 84.42
1997 - 88.24
1998 - 84.38
1999 - 87.88
2000 - 82.74
2001 - 84.21
2003 - 77.30
2004 - 86.61

External links

1975 births
Living people
People from Viitasaari
Finnish male javelin throwers
Athletes (track and field) at the 2004 Summer Olympics
Olympic athletes of Finland
Sportspeople from Central Finland
20th-century Finnish people
21st-century Finnish people